Jack of All Trades is a 2012 Chinese romantic comedy film directed by Pi Jianxin and written by Ma Zhiquan and Lin Manru, starring Wang Baoqiang, Eric Tsang, and Sherry Cao. The film premiered in China on 8 March 2012.

Cast
 Wang Baoqiang as Chu Zhongtian, known by his nickname Lin Danda, a simple and honest young man from countryside.
 Ou Chuanhao as little Chu Zhongtian.
 Eric Tsang as Zhu Yuepo, known by his nickname Zhu Dupi, a businessman.
 Sherry Cao as Fang Yuanyuan, the blind girl who is a flower peddler.

Other
 Grace Ko as Zhu Yuepo's wife.
 Ronan Lo as Zhu Yuepo's son.
 Liao Bencheng as Chu Zhongtian's father.
 Cao Yue'e as Chu Zhongtian's mother.
 Bi Zhigang as Zhu Yuepo's son-in-law.
 Benny Bin as Zhu Yuepo's grandson.

Production
This film took place in Xinyi District, Taipei.

Release
It was released in China on 8 March 2012.

References

External links

2010s Mandarin-language films
Chinese romantic comedy films
Films shot in Taiwan
2012 romantic comedy films